Vishvakarma or Vishvakarman is a craftsman deity and the divine architect of the devas in contemporary Hinduism. In the early texts, the craftsman deity was known as Tvastar and the word "Vishvakarma" was originally used as an epithet for any powerful deity. However, in many later traditions, Vishvakarma became the name of the craftsman god  because of his supreme power of creation.

Vishvakarma crafted all of the chariots of the devas and weapons including the Vajra of the god Indra. Vishvakarma was related to the sun god Surya through his daughter Samjna. According to the legend, when Samjna left her house due to Surya's energy, Vishvakarma reduced the energy and created various other weapons using it. Vishvakarma also built various cities like Lanka, Dvaraka, and Indraprastha. According to the epic Ramayana, the vanara (forest-man or monkey) Nala was the son of Vishvakarma, created to aid the avatar Rama.

Literature and legends

Vedas
 

The term Visvakarman was originally used as an epithet for any supreme god and as an attribute of Indra and the Sun. The name Visvakarman occurs five times in the tenth book of the Rigveda. The two hymns of the Rigveda identify Visvakarman as all-seeing, and having eyes, faces, arms and feet on every side and also has wings. Brahma, the  god of creation, who is four-faced and four-armed resembles him in these aspects. He is represented as being the source of all prosperity, swift in his thoughts and titled a seer, priest, and lord of speech.

According to some parts of the Rigveda, Vishvakarma was the personification of ultimate reality, the abstract creative power inherent in deities, living and non-living being in this universe. He is considered to be the fifth monotheistic God concept: He is both The Architect and The Divine Engineer of The Universe from before the advent of time.

The later parts of the Rigveda reveals efforts to find a satisfactory answer to the mysteries regarding the origin of the universe, the creation hymns present in these parts of the Rigveda mention individual creator gods as opposed to the collection of gods and their chiefs (Indra, Varuna, Agni, etc.) creating the world.

In the historical Vedic religion, the role of Vishvakarma as the builder of gods is attributed to Tvastar. Vedic Vishvakarman is identified with Prajapati rather than Tvaṣṭṛ. In later mythology, Vishvakarman is sometimes identified with Tvaṣṭṛ and is a craftsman deity.

Iconography

Vishvakarma's iconography varies drastically from one region to another, though all picture him with creation tools. In the most popular depiction, he is depicted as an aged and wise man, with four arms. He has white beard and is accompanied by his vahana, hamsa (goose or swan), which scholars believe that these suggest his association with the creator god Brahma. Usually, he is seated on a throne and his sons standing near him. This form of Vishvakarma is mainly found in the Western and North Western parts of India.

Contradictory to the above account, the idols of Vishvakarma in the eastern parts of India depict him as a young muscular man. He has black moustache and is not accompanied by his sons. An elephant is his vahana, suggesting his association with Indra or Brihaspati.

Family 
Parentage of Vishvakarma differs in many other texts. In the Nirukta and Brahmanas he is stated to be the son of Bhuvana. In the Mahabharata and Harivansha, he is the son of Vasu Prabhāsa and Yoga-siddhā. In the Puranas, he is the son of Vāstu or sometimes, Brahma. Vishvakarma is the  father of three daughters named Barhishmati, Samjna and Chitrangada, as well as five sons. In Vamana Purana, Vishvakarma is presented as the husband of the celestial nymph Ghritachi. When identified with Tvastar, Vishvakarma is also described to be the father of a son named Vishvarupa.

Vishvakarma Puja

Among those who celebrate Vishwakarma's birthday, it is celebrated on two days under different names:
 Vishvakarma Puja. "Vishvakarma Puja" always celebrated in India on the 17/18 September of every Year.
 Rishi Panchami Dinam. "Rishi Panchami Dinam" literally means ‘the day of the solidarity of five rishis.’ Those who celebrate this day believe that Vishvakarma did not have a birthday like the mortals but only a commemoration day in which his five children (supposedly five rishis) came together to declare their solidarity and pray to their illustrious father. This day follows the rules of the Hindu calendar and changes with every year. The five groups among the Vishvakarma community also celebrate this as an auspicious day in commemoration of their patron god at present.

See also
Vishvakarma Day
Suthar
Rajgir karigar
Acharya
Barhai
Vishvakarma (caste)
Tarkhan
Lohar
Daksha
Great Architect of the Universe
Kami (caste)
Shilpa Shastras
Great Architect of the Universe
Tvastar
Vishwakarmas
The Poem of Angkor Wat

Bibliography
 Achary, Subramanian Matathinkal (1995): Visvakarmajar Rigvedathil, Sawraj Printing and Publishing Company, Aluva.
 Coomaraswamy, Ananda K. Ananda Coomaraswamy (1979): Medieval Sinhalese Art, Pantheon Books Inc., New York.
 Monier-Williams (1899): 
 Pattanaik, Devdutt Devdutt Pattanaik (2009): 7 Secrets from Hindu Calendar Art. Westland, India. .
 Padhi, Bibhu & Padhi, Minakshi Bibhu Padhi (1998): Indian Philosophy and Religion: A Reader's Guide (3rd ed.). D.K. Printworld. . 
 Borad, Siddharth & Om, Dr. Jayshree (2020): The Ancient Science of Vastu. BlueRose. .

References

Further reading
 Dr G Gnanananda, "Vishvakarma Darshana-Vishawakarma Volume-1 (2008), "Sanskriti Sahithya Pratisthana, Bangalore Publications"
 Dr G Gnanananda, "Vishvakarma Darshana-Hiranyagarbha Volume-2 (2009), "Sanskriti Sahithya Pratisthana, Bangalore Publications"
 Dr G Gnanananda, "Vishvakarma Darshana-Rhubugalu Volume-3 (2010), "Sanskriti Sahithya Pratisthana, Bangalore Publications"

External links

 Vishvakarma Samaj

Crafts gods
Creator gods
Hindu gods
Buddhist gods
Rigvedic deities
Smithing gods
Characters in the Mahabharata